Helvijs Babris (born 13 May 1998) is a Latvian BMX cyclist.

A multiple national champion, he uses the Training Center for High-Class Athletes (AKSSC) in Valmiera. He was selected in the Latvian team for the Cycling at the 2020 Summer Olympics – Men's BMX racing. He finished twentieth overall but did not progress to the semi-finals. He was voted the sportsman of the year by the city of Valmiera in 2021.

He has also represented Latvia in bobsleigh at Europe Cup level.

References

External links
 
 
 
 
 

1998 births
Living people
BMX riders
Latvian cyclists
Olympic cyclists of Latvia
Cyclists at the 2020 Summer Olympics